, also known as Megaten and Sampling Masters MEGA, is a Japanese video game composer and musician most famous for scoring Ridge Racer, Street Fighter EX and many Namco arcade games between 1987 and 1996. He also runs the music production and publishing company SuperSweep, alongside long time collaborator Ayako Saso.

Biography

Early life 
Hosoe was born on February 28, 1967, in Gero, Gifu Prefecture, Japan. His family moved to Chōfu while he was in first grade of elementary school. At the age of 8, he bought Isao Tomita's album The Planets. He also listened to electronic music by artists such as Jean-Michel Jarre, Kraftwerk and Yellow Magic Orchestra. During his teenage years, he played bass in a Yellow Magic Orchestra tribute band. At the time, he did not have a serious interest in music and received low grades in music classes. After graduating high school, he studied computer graphics at Japan Electronics College.

Namco (1985–1996) 
Hosoe joined Namco in 1985 as a part-time game tester and CG artist. During this time, he merely created music as a hobby in his spare time. After showing his music to fellow co-workers, he was reassigned the position of a composer in 1986. This led to him composing for Dragon Spirit, as well as various other arcade games such as Final Lap, Ordyne and Dirt Fox. He started off tracks by programming a rhythm into the sequencer, then playing melodies with a keyboard on-top, and later adding new parts or re-writing existing parts. In 1990, he composed for Galaxian3: Project Dragoon, working with Ayako Saso and Takayuki Aihara for the first time; he found himself busy with lots of other work, hence other tracks were composed by the other two composers. 

In 1992, Hosoe composed for Fighter & Attacker alongside Aihara, his first game project to utilize dance music. The following year, he composed for Ridge Racer alongside Saso and Nobuyoshi Sano. While racing games at this point often featured jazz fusion music, the majority of tracks in the game are dance music. The success of Ridge Racer has since led to him receiving many offers from companies to compose similar music. He also composed for Cyber Sled earlier that year, which he considers to be his greatest work, although it received a mixed reception from critics, who criticized it for being repetitive.

Arika and SuperSweep (1996–present) 
Hosoe left Namco to join Arika in 1996, feeling that his salary would not increase any further. Saso and Aihara also joined Arika desiring to continue working with him, although Sano remained at Namco. This led to the trio composing for Street Fighter EX along with its sequels. The console versions were their first game projects to feature live instrumentation. Ex-Taito composer Yasuhisa Watanabe later joined the sound team. The trio were also given freedom to work on the music of Square games Bushido Blade and Driving Emotion Type-S. The latter game was poorly received by game critics and fans, although the soundtrack has received praise for its blend of fusion, rock and techno music. However, the music also received criticism, with one critic describing it as sounding like "a flock of seagulls being maimed and tortured".

Upon joining Arika, he expressed a desire to eventually found his own game music company, which eventually led to him leaving in 2000 and founding SuperSweep alongside Saso and Watanabe. Yousuke Yasui, who had already tried to apply to join Arika, also joined the company as a composer. In addition to composing for games, the company also publishes various soundtracks. 

One of SuperSweep's first works was the soundtrack of Arika's Technictix in 2001, which Hosoe considers to be one of his most significant contributions to game music. The team also worked on the music of the game's sequel Technic Beat. The game's producer, Ichiro Mihara, decided that the game's soundtrack would include remixes of music from earlier Namco and Arika games. Mihara chose which tracks would be included in the game, while the composers decided on which tracks they wanted to remix, at times fighting with other composers over who would remix a track.

In 2004, Hosoe and Saso worked on the gameplay soundtrack of Xenosaga Episode II: Jenseits von Gut und Böse, with Yuki Kajiura composing the cutscene music. Kajiura worked entirely separate from Hosoe and Saso, and did not collaborate on any tracks nor even meet during the game's production. For the gameplay tracks, Hosoe composed those with the sound hardware of the PlayStation 2, and opted to use an electronic sound over orchestral due to the limited memory available to work with, in an attempt to make the difference in sound quality between the gameplay and cutscene soundtracks smaller. His music for the game was poorly received by critics and fans at the time, and were considered unfitting; as a result, he had no interest in releasing a soundtrack CD at the time and did not return to compose for Xenosaga Episode III: Also Sprach Zarathustra, although his work eventually received a more positive reception from fans.

Along with Saso, Kenji Kawai and other composers, he scored Folklore in 2007. The game features a serious, dark cinematic score; while Hosoe most frequently works on upbeat electronic music, he found the music easy to compose due to not having to focus on sound design. In 2009, he served as the sole composer of Nine Hours, Nine Persons, Nine Doors, which also features dark, intense music. He found the music straightforward to compose. As he had to compose the music using the Nintendo DS sound hardware, Yasui assisted him in ensuring that the music sounded close to the quality of recorded music. He would go on to compose for later titles in the Zero Escape series, including Zero Escape: Virtue's Last Reward in 2012 and Zero Time Dilemma in 2016.

In 2016, game company Breaking Bytes announced that if its shoot 'em up game Xydonia is successfully funded, then Hosoe and Keishi Yonao will contribute additional tracks to the game. Saso and Yasui are also planned to be additional composers for the game if the stretch goal of €32,000 is reached. However, as of 2022 the game has yet to be released.

Side projects 
In addition to his career as a composer for games and other media, Hosoe has also participated in a number of side projects. He founded the record label Troubadour Record in 1991. The label released a number of game soundtrack-inspired concept albums, featuring other prolific video game composers such as Hitoshi Sakimoto and Hayato Matsuo, as well as vocal and cover albums. He was also part of the group Oriental Magnetic Yellow (O.M.Y.), parodying Yellow Magic Orchestra, alongside fellow Namco composers Sano, Aihara, and Hiroto Sasaki. The group released several albums and also performed concerts. He has also released albums under the Sampling Masters name with Saso, including the Over Drive Hell series of albums. He has also participated in the Nanosweep album series, which features original tracks by composers from both SuperSweep and Hiroshi Okubo's circle nanosounds.

Works

Video games

As lead composer

As a contributor

Non-music roles

Anime

Footnotes

Notes

References

External links
 Official English website
 Megahan's Hell – Shinji Hosoe's blog (Japanese only)
 Super Sweep Records site (Japanese only)
 

1967 births
Anime composers
Japanese composers
Japanese film score composers
Japanese male composers
Japanese male film score composers
Japanese male musicians
Japanese techno musicians
Living people
Musicians from Gifu Prefecture
Video game composers
Video game musicians
Vocaloid musicians